The All-Armenian National Statehood Party, also known as the Pan-Armenian National Statehood Party is an Armenian political party. It was founded on 13 May 2021 and is currently led by Artur Vardanyan.

History
The All-Armenian National Statehood Party was founded in May 2021 and Arthur Vardanyan was unanimously elected chairman of the party. The party subsequently announced its intentions to participate in the 2021 Armenian parliamentary election. The party opposed forming any alliances with other political parties. Following the election, the party won 0.06% of the popular vote, failing to win any seats in the National Assembly. Currently, the party acts as an extra-parliamentary force.

Ideology
The party supports the continued economic development of the country, increasing security and protecting the territorial integrity of Armenia. In terms of foreign policy, the party has stated that it is not explicitly Pro-Russian or Pro-European, but rather focuses on being "Pro-Armenian".

Electoral record

Parliamentary elections

See also

 Programs of political parties in Armenia

References

External links 
 All-Armenian National Statehood Party on Facebook

Political parties established in 2021
Political parties in Armenia